Aviana or Avianna is a feminine given name with multiple origins. It is a Greenlandic name, a variant of the Greenlandic name Avek, meaning "family", combined with the Greenlandic ending -na that is indicative of a first name. It has been a popular name for girls in Greenland in recent years.

It is also considered a modern English elaboration of Ava or Eva with the popular -ana or -anna ending for feminine given names in English, as in Ariana. It might also be derived from a combination of the Hebrew Avi, meaning "my father" and Anna.

The name might also be derived from avis or avian, the Latin term for "bird".

The name has been well-used for girls in recent years in the United States.

People 
 Avianna Chao (born 1975), Chinese-born Canadian sport shooter.

Notes 

Feminine given names
Given names derived from birds